Craiova metropolitan area is a metropolitan area, founded on 11 February 2009, and formed by Craiova and other 23 other nearby communities. The population of this area is 356,544.

As defined by Eurostat, the Craiova functional urban area has a population of 325,499 residents.

References

Metropolitan areas of Romania
Geography of Dolj County